Barsukovo (Burhıq) is a rural locality (a village) in Nizhnekachmashevsky Selsoviet, Kaltasinsky District, Bashkortostan, Russia. The population was 12 as of 2010. There is 1 street.

Geography 
Barsukovo is located 9 km south of Kaltasy (the district's administrative centre) by road. Alexandrovka is the nearest rural locality.

References 

Rural localities in Kaltasinsky District